Immigration to Uruguay began in several millennia BCE with the arrival of different populations from Asia to the Americas through Beringia, according to the most accepted theories, and were slowly populating the Americas. The most recent waves of immigrants started with the arrival of Spaniards in the 16th century, during the colonial period, to what was then known as the Banda Oriental. Immigration to Uruguay is very similar to, if not the same, as immigration to Argentina.

Throughout its history, Uruguay has experienced massive waves of immigration from all around the world, specifically from the European continent, and today 90–95% of the Uruguayan population has European ancestry. The largest of these waves of immigration occurred between the last third of the 19th century and World War II, when the whole European continent was in turmoil. The largest groups of immigrants in Uruguay are the Spanish and Italians, both establishing the backbone of modern-day Uruguayan culture and society.

Overview
Uruguay is a multi-ethnic nation formed by the combination of different groups over five centuries. Amerindians inhabited Uruguayan territory for several millennia before the Spanish Conquest in the 16th century. Spaniards and Africans arrived in significant numbers under colonial rule, including many from a European background, some with an African background, and some Amerindians.

Beginning in the second half of the 19th century, there has been gradual European immigration from several countries, which had its peak between 1870 and 1920; back then, the Villa del Cerro neighbourhood in Montevideo was characteristically populated by immigrants.

In April 1831, government troops massacred most of the Amerindian population under the command of General Fructuoso Rivera; this is remembered as the Matanza del Salsipuedes.

Main immigration groups

Spaniards, Italians, and descendants of African slaves together formed the backbone of modern day Uruguayan culture and society.

Minor immigrant groups that, although are small in number, still play an important role in Uruguayan society, include:

 French: Making up 10% of Uruguay's population (c. 300,000), Frenchmen began immigrating to South America during the 1800s. French Uruguayans are the third largest ancestry group in Uruguay, behind Spaniards and Italians. Ever since French immigrants entered Uruguay, French influence has always been strong in Uruguayan culture.
 Basques (needs information)
 Germans: Uruguay does contain a number of Germans: about 10,000 German expatriates and 40,000 people of German descent. Uruguay has also adopted some of Germany's culture, and a variety of German institutions.
 Jews: Uruguay has about 12,000–20,000 Jews, and even though it isn't a large number, it's one of the biggest Jewish communities in the world, and one of the biggest religions in Uruguay. The majority of Jews entered during World War I and World War II, the most being Ashkenazi Jews, German Jews, and Italian Jews.
 Lebanese: There are about 53,000–70,000 Lebanese in Uruguay; it is one of the oldest immigrant groups in South America, dating the first wave back around the 1860s.
 Other significant minorities include: Armenians, Austrians, Britons, Bulgarians, Croats, Greeks, Hungarians, Irish, Scots, Syrians, Lithuanians, Poles, Russians, Romani, Slovaks, Slovenes, Swiss, Ukrainians. There are very small Asian communities, mainly from China, Japan and Korea.

There is a very recent inflow of Latin Americans: Peruvians, Bolivians, Paraguayans, Venezuelans. The University of the Republic is free, which means that many Chilean students come to study in Uruguay. Many people from neighboring Argentina and Brazil, who frequently travel to Uruguay to spend their holidays, have chosen it as permanent residence. In a very recent trend, North Americans and Europeans are also choosing to retire in Uruguay. There are over 12,000 foreign workers from 81 countries registered in the Uruguayan social security.

Immigrants tend to integrate into mainstream society, as several scholars have shown.

Based on data from the 2011 census, currently there are about 77,000 immigrants in Uruguay and 27,000 returning Uruguayans.

As of October 2014, Uruguay received a new flow of immigrants from Syria as a consequence of the Syrian Civil War.

With the construction works of UPM pulp mills in Fray Bentos and later near Paso de los Toros, new small waves of immigrants have entered the country, in search of jobs.

In recent years Uruguay has been experiencing the drama of stateless people. The Government has plans to diversify the reasons for obtaining visas to adapt to the new reality.

Children 
About 1.3% of schoolchildren are foreigners, mostly from Brazil, Argentina, Spain, Venezuela, and the USA. A total of 62 countries are represented in Uruguayan schools.

See also
Demography of Uruguay
Emigration from Uruguay
Spanish Uruguayan
Italian Uruguayan
French Uruguayan
German Uruguayans
Jews in Uruguay
Culture of Uruguay
Afro-Uruguayan
Immigration to Argentina

Bibliography
 Goebel, Michael. "Gauchos, Gringos and Gallegos: The Assimilation of Italian and Spanish Immigrants in the Making of Modern Uruguay 1880–1930," Past and Present (August 2010) 208(1): 191–229 
 Bresciano, Juan Andrés. "L'Immigrazione Italiana in Uruguay Nella Piu Recente Storiografia (1990–2005)." ["Italian immigration to Uruguay in the most recent historiography, 1990–2005"] Studi Emigrazione, June 2008, Vol. 45 Issue 170, pp 287–299

References

 
Society of Uruguay
Demographics of Uruguay